Gülek is a town in Mersin Province, Turkey.

Gülek may also refer to:
 Gülek Pass or Cilician Gates

People with the surname
 Kasım Gülek (1905–1996), Turkish statesman
 Tayyibe Gülek (born 1968), Turkish economist and politician

Turkish-language surnames